Orson Kent Ryan  (February 2, 1915 – February 3, 2006) was a professional American football player who played defensive back for three seasons (1938, 1939, and 1940) for the Detroit Lions in the National Football League. He also served in the Army and was called in to serve in the South Pacific in 1941 for 5 years.

He, along with Don Hutson and Ace Parker, led the league in interceptions with 6 for the 1940 season, the first in which the NFL kept records.

External links

1915 births
2006 deaths
All-American college men's basketball players
People from Midvale, Utah
Players of American football from Utah
American football halfbacks
Detroit Lions players
Utah State Aggies football players
Utah State Aggies men's basketball players
American men's basketball players